Monte Real Air Base, officially designated as Air Force Base No. 5 (BA5), is a Portuguese Air Force (PoAF) air base located in Monte Real, Leiria, Portugal. Its mission is to guarantee the readiness and deployment of the air force units based there. Since its opening in October 1959, the base has been home to the air force's jet fighter aircraft, with several of the units based there being equipped with F-86F Sabre, Fiat G.91, T-33 Shooting Star, T-38 Talon and A-7 Corsair II aircraft.

The base is currently home to two F-16 Fighting Falcon squadrons.

History
The air base is located at the former installations of the aero club of Leiria, that existed from 1938 to 1941, when it became a military aerodrome of the Portuguese Army's aviation service. In 1952 the Army's aviation and the Portuguese Navy's aviation service were merged, resulting in the creation of the Portuguese Air Force, but the aerodrome wasn't actively used until the air base was established in 1959.

Construction of the air base began in 1957 and was completed in 1959, it being officially inaugurated on 4 October by the President of the Republic Admiral Américo Tomás. That same year the first Portuguese F-86F Sabre squadron, Esquadra 50 "Falcões", that was created the previous year, was transferred to Monte Real and was re-designated as 51 Squadron "Falcões" (Falcons). At the same time a second F-86F squadron, 52 Squadron "Galos" (Roosters), was also formed.

Adopting the motto "Alcança Quem Não Cansa" (attaining without ceasing), these two squadrons became part of the new Operational Group 501 and together totaled 50 F-86F combat aircraft. This number was later increased to 65 fighters. 52 Squadron was disbanded on 12 July 1961.

Between 1974 and 1987 the Advanced Fighter Training Squadron (E.I.C.P.A.C.), later re-designated as 103 Squadron, was based at Monte Real and operated the T-33A Shooting Star and T-38A Talon.

On 24 December 1981, a new chapter began at Air Base No. 5 with the arrival of first nine A-7P Corsair II fighter aircraft. The number eventually grew to 20, and these aircraft formed 302 Attack Squadron, taking on the symbols and traditions of the 51 Squadron "Falcões."

On 28 June 1984, during a meeting of the NATO Commission of Infrastructures in Brussels, Monte Real was formally accepted as NATO infrastructure to be equipped with two attack squadrons of A-7P aircraft and a future interceptor squadron.

On the 25th anniversary of the inauguration of Monte Real Air Base, 4 October 1984, the 304 Attack Squadron was officially activated and became the second attack squadron with A-7P aircraft. This squadron became the heir of the traditions, symbols, and deeds of the 93 Squadron "Magníficos" (Magnificents), deactivated at Air Base No. 9, in 1973 in Luanda, Africa.On 4 October 1993, the 201 Squadron was activated and equipped with F-16 Fighting Falcon fighters. This squadron resumed the air defence mission, and inherited the traditions and symbol of the "Falcões."

On 25 November 2005, 301 Squadron was transferred to Air Base No. 5 from Air Base No. 11 in Beja and received the first F-16 fighters upgraded with the Mid-Life Update (F-16AM and F-16BM) of the Portuguese Air Force. The squadron maintained the symbols and traditions of the "Jaguares" (Jaguars).

Work on the PoAF's F-16 Mid-Life Update program is carried out at the workshops at Monte Real Air Base, namely the facilities designated as dock 4, as well the flight testing of the upgraded aircraft.

Tenant units
Monte Real Air Base hosts the 51st Operational Group (GO51). The GO51's operational fighter squadrons are:
 201 Fighter Squadron "Falcões" (Falcons)
 301 Fighter Squadron "Jaguares" (Jaguars)

Both squadrons fly the F-16 Fighting Falcon.

Former tenant units
 51 Squadron "Falcões" (1959–1978)
 52 Squadron "Roosters" (1959–1961)
 E.I.C.P.A.C. (1974–1987)
 302 Squadron (1981–1996)
 304 Squadron (1984–1999)

Infrastructures
The base has one runway:
 Ident.: 01/19
 QFU: 007º/187º
 LDA: 8,000 ft / 2.438 m
 TORA: 9,000 ft / 2.743 m
 Width: 148 ft / 45 m
 ILS: Yes
 PCN: 027RAWT

There are four main apron areas (A1 to D1) on the East side of the base, and some twenty parking bays on the west side.

See also
 Portuguese Air Force
 Exercise Real Thaw
 Field Firing Range of Alcochete

References

External links

 Base Aérea Nº 5, base page at the Portuguese Air Force website 

Portuguese Air Force bases
Buildings and structures in Leiria District
Military of Portugal
Military installations in Portugal